Esperanza, officially the Municipality of Esperanza,  is a 5th class municipality in the province of Masbate, Philippines. According to the 2020 census, it has a population of 17,534 people.

About 60% of the population lives along the coastline, most of whom are fishermen. It is about 4 hours travel south of Masbate City with some roads and highways still undeveloped.

Esperanza has several beaches, among them Gamay Na Baybay Beach, Talisay (Punta) Beach and Manok Manok Beach. Esperanza is a predominantly Cebuano speaking municipality, with a majority of its settlers tracing their ancestries from northern Cebu, particularly from Bogo. Esperanza is one of the four municipalities which are predominantly Cebuano speaking in the province of Masbate.

History 

People in the 1970s to early 1990s were heavily dependent on the water resources in the so-called Kapayawan, which means "deep well".  It is the only safe water source for the majority of the people living in the area.  In 2000, Esperanza was finally connected to the electricity grid supplied by MASELCO which benefited 80% of the households in the area.

In 2006, President Gloria Arroyo defined Esperanza to be the most accessible town in Masbate going to Samar, Leyte and Cebu.  That is the primary reason why the National Government constructed the port to serve as a roll-on/roll-off (RORO) gateway. The RORO vessels coming from Masbate docks at the RORO Port located at Barangay Polambato, Bogo, Cebu.

Esperanza is about Four (4) hours land travel South from Masbate City, the last municipality in the south located between Placer in north-west and Pio V Corpus in southeast and considered as among the smallest in the island. Esperanza was initially one of the barangays of the town of Placer.

In early 1915, a group of first settlers [Conag, Arabis, Pelayo and Serafin families] sailed from northern Cebu using their paddled banca and settled the place. The settlers actively cultivated the area into a productive agricultural community, developing the place until eventually called “Halabangbaybay”. Halabangbaybay means [Long Beach], due to its elongated shoreline and white fine sand. Halabangbaybay at that era was a green-mountainous forest community. It was not recognized as a barrio or even a mere sitio.

In the 1940s, Halabangbaybay became a sitio of the barrio Alegria in Cataingan. Soon after, it was converted into a barrio named Esperanza as a barangay of Placer in 1948 (the year the barrio Placer was separated from Cataingan and constituted as its own municipality) and Pablo M. Conag served as the “teniente del Barrio”. The name Esperanza means "Hope" in reference to the first group of migrants in 1915 who hoped for a better life by settling on the present day area of Esperanza.

In the mid-1950s, Lawyer Alfonso E. Conag [One of the sons of Felimon Serafin Conag] initiated vigorously and pursued for the conversion of Esperanza into an independent municipality. Esperanza officially became an independent municipality on by virtue of Executive Order No. 337 of May 7, 1959.

On July 2, 1959, the set of municipal officials started to hold office and Santos Edem Conag, the eldest son of Felimo Serafin Conag, became the first elected mayor.

As of August 1, 2007, Esperanza has a total population of 16,834 according to National Statistic Office data.

Geography

Barangays
Esperanza is politically subdivided into 20 barangays. Esperanza has eleven barangays located along the coastal line and nine in farm areas with an estimated of seventy 70% of the population belongs to the fisher folks.

Climate 

Weather in Esperanza is generally divided into two seasonal weather patterns known locally as the Amihan and Habagat seasons. In the Tagalog language, Amihan means a cool north-east wind, and Habagat means west or south-west wind; south-west monsoon. Amihan and Habagat seasons are generally associated respectively with the El Niño and La Niña global weather patterns. The Amihan season is characterized by moderate temperatures, little or no rainfall, and a prevailing wind from the east. The Habagat season is characterized by hot and humid weather, frequent heavy rainfall, and a prevailing wind from the west.

On Esperanza, the main indicator of the switch between the Amihan and Habagat seasonal patterns is the switch in wind direction. In most years this transition is abrupt and occurs overnight. In some years there is a period of perhaps a week or two where the wind will switch between Amihan and Habagat patterns several times before settling into the pattern for the new season. As a rule of thumb, Labangtatay will be in the Habagat weather pattern from sometime in September or October to sometime in May or June and in the Amihan weather pattern for the remainder of the year. These dates can vary in individual years, though.

Daytime temperatures on Esperanza generally range from 77 to 90 °F (25-32 °C) from the beginning of the Amihan season into February or March, increase to the 82-100 °F (28-38 °C) range until the onset of the Habagat season, and moderate back to the 77-90 °F (25-32 °C) range with the return of the Amihan season.[8] During Tropical Storm periods, temperatures can fall below 68 °F (20 °C). Tropical Storms can impact Esperanza at any time of year, but are most likely to be seen during the Habagat season.

Demographics

Economy

Transportation 

In Esperanza, the two main modes of transport are via motor-tricycles along the main road or by walking along the beaches. Pedicabs are also available for transport along the beachfront path. Other means of transportation include mountain bikes, quad bikes, and motorbikes, all of which can be rented.

To explore around the island's coast, motorized bancas and sailing paraws are available for rent. These are outrigger canoes and are a common sight in waters around the island. The sailing paraw is a narrow hulled boat with outriggers on either side and with passengers sometimes seated on a trampoline platform between the outrigger supports. These are extremely fast off the wind but can be unwieldy for inexperienced sailors.

References

External links 

 [ Philippine Standard Geographic Code]
Philippine Census Information
Local Governance Performance Management System

Municipalities of Masbate
Establishments by Philippine executive order